Akron/Family & Angels of Light is a split album between New York band Akron/Family and Michael Gira's band Angels of Light. It was released on November 8, 2005, via Gira's own record label, Young God Records.

The album features seven original songs by Akron/Family and three original songs by Angels of Light, plus a version of "Mother/Father" (originally performed by Gira's former group Swans, from the album, The Great Annihilator) and a cover of Bob Dylan's "I Pity the Poor Immigrant". Akron/Family play backing instruments on all of the Angels of Light tracks.

Critical reception
Upon its release, Akron/Family & Angels of Light received positive reviews from music critics. At Metacritic, which assigns a normalized rating out of 100 to reviews from critics, the album received an average score of 81, which indicates "universal acclaim", based on 15 reviews. Tammy La Gorce of AllMusic stated: "Pair Akron/Family with Angels of Light and what you get, apologies to the label-sensitive, is Grade A art rock." About the collaboration, Sam Ubl of Pitchfork wrote: "Gira's fatherly measuredness is a nice foil to Akron's hyperkinetic mini-opera-- at this point, he may be overparenting, but damnit they'll thank him someday." Josh Honn of Stylus Magazine described the albums as "a blend of just about any sonic form one can recall ever hearing," while also further adding that "Gira’s relationship with Akron/Family have created what truly is, in the end, a complete album of epic scale, musical significance and a highly prescient lesson in listening, participating and challenging."

J. Spicer of Tiny Mix Tapes wrote: "This split album breaks new ground for Akron/Family while continuing to affirm Michael Gira as a reputable singer/songwriter," while also concluding that "Gira's influence on Akron/Family is heard throughout each track." PopMatters reviewer Justin Cober-Lake also commented on the album: "This album takes the energy from the live show and mixes it with the creativity of their stunning self-titled debut from earlier this year." Janne Oinonen of Gigwise also commented: "There's plenty to savour here, though, not least the chance to hear Akron Family rein in their genre-hopping tendencies to offer a suitably sparse backing to this stark set of songs that could well originate from the same desolate district as the dustblown gems on Mark Lanegan's Field Songs."

Track listing 
Tracks 1-7 are written by Seth Olinsky, Miles Seaton and Ryan Vanderhoof. Tracks 9-12 are written by Michael Gira.

Personnel
The album personnel, as adapted from Allmusic:

Akron/Family
Seth Olinsky - performance
Miles Seaton - performance
Ryan Vanderhoof - performance

Angels of Light
Michael Gira - art direction, design, production, performance (8-12)

Other personnel
Bryce Goggin - engineering, mixing, performance
Drew Goren - photography
Doug Henderson - mastering
Ben Kirkendoll - design, layout design

References

External links
 Akron/Family & Angels of Light on Young God Records

2006 albums
Akron/Family albums
Young God Records albums
Albums produced by Michael Gira
2005 albums
Angels of Light albums
Split albums